The 1952 Appalachian State Mountaineers football team was an American football team that represented Appalachian State Teachers College (now known as Appalachian State University) as a member of the North State Conference during the 1952 college football season. In their fifth year under head coach E. C. Duggins, the Mountaineers compiled an overall record of 2–6–1, with a mark of 2–4 in conference play, and finished fifth in the NSC.

Schedule

References

Appalachian State
Appalachian State Mountaineers football seasons
Appalachian State Mountaineers football